Martin Marinac (born 15 July 1979) is a retired Austrian alpine skier.

He made his World Cup debut in January 2002 in Kitzbühel, also collecting his first World Cup points with a 10th place. His career best was a 6th place in January 2003 in Schladming, Marinac remaining a consistent top-25 finisher throughout his career. He only finished below the top 25 once, in his penultimate World Cup race. His last World Cup outing came in December 2006 in Alta Badia.

References

External links
 

1979 births
Living people
Austrian male alpine skiers
Place of birth missing (living people)